Tomás Brown was an Argentine footballer who played for the Alumni Athletic Club. Brown was an Argentine of Scottish origin. Brown had five brothers who were Argentine international players – Alfredo, Carlos, Eliseo, Ernesto and Jorge – as well as one cousin, Juan Domingo. Another brother – Diego – also played for Alumni Athletic Club.

References

Argentine footballers
Argentine people of Scottish descent
Alumni Athletic Club players

Association footballers not categorized by position
Brown family (Argentina)